Enrico Brusoni (10 December 1878 – 26 November 1949) was an Italian cyclist.

Biography
He won the Olympic gold medal at the 1900 Summer Olympics in the Points Race, this medal is not recognized by International Olympic Committee, but is recognized by Italian National Olympic Committee.

See also
Italy at the 1900 Summer Olympics

References

External links
 
 
 
 
 

1878 births
1949 deaths
Italian male cyclists
Cyclists at the 1900 Summer Olympics
Olympic cyclists of Italy
Sportspeople from Arezzo
Medalists at the 1900 Summer Olympics
Olympic gold medalists for Italy
Olympic medalists in cycling
Cyclists from Tuscany
20th-century Italian people